"Adult Education" is a song by American duo Daryl Hall & John Oates, released as a single in February 1984 and debuting on the Billboard Hot 100 on February 18. The song is featured on the duo's second compilation album Rock 'n Soul Part 1 (1983). It was one of two new tracks that were recorded specifically for the compilation release and hit number eight on the US Billboard Hot 100. This song was featured in the 2013 video game Grand Theft Auto V.

Lyrics
The song centers on the plight of a teenage girl in high school. Her girlfriends only "care about what she wears" and the narrator assures her "there's life after high school." The lyrics suggest she is wiser than her years and, in fact, is receiving an education to the behavior of adults in high school.

Music video
The music video to "Adult Education", directed by Tim Pope, takes place in what appears to be a torchlit stone temple or tomb.  As Hall & Oates and their band sing, dance and play with modified instruments and ceremonial objects, a middle-aged man in a baseball cap organizes and wields several idols, while chanting.  A teenage boy wearing a loincloth and a teenage girl draped in a white sheet cross a platform illuminated with modern lights and ascend a staircase to meet the man, who appears to bless them with an animal idol.  The girl removes the sheet from her head and part of her body and the ritual continues.  Eventually, both teenagers are placed on stone slabs; the boy acts terrified and appears to be restrained, while the girl lies motionless, her body draped in the white sheet.  The video ends with the boy standing behind the idols' altar and the girl sitting on the stone slab in front of it, as Hall & Oates and their band continue to sing, dance and play instruments in the background.  The final shots of the video are of hieroglyphs and ceremonial items scattered around the structure.

Hall later criticized the video in the book I Want My MTV: The Uncensored Story of the Music Video Revolution.  "Videos began to attract wannabe Cecil B. DeMilles, directors who had almost unlimited budgets and did whatever they felt like. 'Adult Education' is a perfect example. We brought in a director I didn't know [Pope], who was newly hot. He didn't have a clue what to do with the song. The plot? I couldn't tell you." On VH1's Behind the Music retrospective of Hall & Oates' career, Oates also derided many of their old videos, describing this clip as "Survivor on acid".

Charts

Weekly charts

Year-end charts

See also
 1984 in music

References

1983 songs
1984 singles
Hall & Oates songs
Songs written by John Oates
Songs written by Daryl Hall
RCA Records singles
Music videos directed by Tim Pope
Songs about school
Song recordings produced by Bob Clearmountain
Songs written by Sara Allen